Deivison William Borges (born 12 April 1991), commonly known as Deivison, is a Brazilian footballer who plays as a forward for Portuguese club Santarém.

Career statistics

Club

Notes

References

1991 births
Living people
Brazilian footballers
Brazilian expatriate footballers
Association football forwards
Clube Esportivo Bento Gonçalves players
Clube Esportivo Lajeadense players
Esporte Clube Juventude players
Galícia Esporte Clube players
Bangu Atlético Clube players
Bonsucesso Futebol Clube players
Resende Futebol Clube players
Uberlândia Esporte Clube players
S.C. Covilhã players
Liga Portugal 2 players
Brazilian expatriate sportspeople in Portugal
Expatriate footballers in Portugal
Footballers from Porto Alegre